{{DISPLAYTITLE:Prostaglandin D2}}

Prostaglandin D2 (or PGD2) is a prostaglandin that binds to the receptor PTGDR (DP1), as well as CRTH2 (DP2). It is a major prostaglandin produced by mast cells – recruits Th2 cells, eosinophils, and basophils. In mammalian organs, large amounts of PGD2 are found only in the brain and in mast cells. It is critical to development of allergic diseases such as asthma. 
Research carried out in 1989 found PGD2 is the primary mediator of vasodilation (the "niacin flush") after ingestion of niacin (nicotinic acid).

A 2012 research paper  indicates a causal link between elevated levels of localized PGD2 and hair growth inhibition. Applied topically, the researchers found PGD2 prevents hair growth, and mice that were genetically inclined to produce higher levels of PGD2 had inhibited hair growth. The researchers also found PGD2 levels were much higher in balding scalp tissue than nonbalding scalp tissue, through increased levels of prostaglandin D2 synthase. The paper suggested that inhibition of hair growth involved binding of PGD2 to a receptor called GPR44, and that GPR44 therefore would be a therapeutic target for androgenic alopecia in both men and women with hair loss and thinning. Because PGD2's relation to asthma has been known for several years, several drugs that seek to reduce the effect of PGD2 through blocking the GPR44 are already in clinical trials.

Production
Cellular synthesis occurs through the arachidonic acid cascade with the final conversion from PGH2 done by PGD2 synthase (PTGDS).
In the brain, production occurs via an alternative pathway through the soluble, secreted enzyme β-trace

Effects
PGD2 causes a contraction of the bronchial airways. Its concentration in asthma patients is 10 times higher than in control patients, especially after it is brought into contact with allergens.
It is involved in the regulation of reducing body temperature in sleep, and acts opposite to PGE2 .
It causes vasodilation at low doses
It causes vasoconstriction at high doses
Elevated levels of PGD2 and PGD2 synthase in scalp hair follicles may be partially responsible for male pattern baldness.
PGD2 also plays a part in male sexual development. It forms a feedforward loop with Sox9, which is activated by the SRY of the Y chromosome. PGD2, in a different feedforward loop than FGF9, helps keep the level of SOX9 high enough to activate other genes, such as Fgf9 and Sf1, which are necessary for the development of the male reproductive system 
PGD2 plays a role in the attraction of neutrophils (chemotaxis).
PGD2 with Adenosine promotes sleep.

Inhibitors 
In silico simulations have predicted the following as potential inhibitors of PGD2 synthase:

 Ricinoleic acid
 Acteoside
 Amentoflavone
 Rutin
 Hinokiflavone

Natural inhibitors of Prostaglandin synthesis including PGD2 are Vitamin K and Vitamin D3.

See also
 PGD2 synthase

References

Prostaglandins